Nettie Lorene Murray MacGinitie (February 27, 1899 – June 16, 1993) was an American marine biologist and malacologist. She worked for a while as a director of the Kerckhoff Marine Laboratory between 1957 and 1959. She also wrote books and helped in producing films on marine life.

Nettie was born in Falls City, Polk County, Oregon to Catherina Kurz and Lindley Byron Murray. She grew up in a homestead and went to study at Oregon State College. In 1925, during a summer at the Hopkins Marine Station of Stanford University she met George MacGinitie for the first time at a tidepool and they married in 1927. George later became a director at the Kerckhoff Marine Laboratory serving as its director from 1932 to 1957. Upon his retirement Nettie became the director working there for two years. Together they also served on a naval marine study at Point Barrow in Alaska and she described numerous species of molluscs from the collections made there. Nettie was involved in producing films on marine life including Secrets of Life (1956), Mysteries of the Deep (1959) and the 1954 Walt Disney production of 20,000 Leagues Under the Sea. The couple also wrote the Natural History of Marine Animals, the first edition of which was published in 1949. In 1974 they wrote a children's book The Wild World of George and Nettie MacGinitie. Their research influenced the conservation of Elkhorn Slough.

The MacGinities had one son, Walter Harold who became a specialist in reading and literacy testing and is best known for the Gates-MacGinitie Reading Test.

References

External links 
 Summary of the Wild World
 Genealogy

American marine biologists
1899 births
1993 deaths
Oregon State University alumni